Ajahn is a Thai- and Lao-derived term that translates as "professor" or "teacher". The term is in turn derived from the Pali word ācariya and is a term of respect, similar in meaning to the Japanese sensei. It is used as a title of address for high school and university teachers, and for Buddhist monks who have passed ten vassa – in other words those who have maintained their monastic precepts unbroken for a period of ten years. The term Luang Por, "Venerable father", signifies an ajahn of acknowledged seniority in Thai Buddhism.

Buddhism 
According to the Vinaya, any properly ordained monk can become an  after ten vassa in the robes, thus a Thai monk becomes ajahn.

A senior monk may bear the honorific title  phra ajahn ("venerable monk"), or in more informal situations, than ajahn ("venerable monk").

Some famous ajahns are:
 Ajahn Amaro
 Ajahn Maha Boowa
 Ajahn Brahm
 Ajahn Chah
 Ajahn Jayasāro
 Ajahn Khemadhammo
 Ajahn Lee
 Ajahn Mun
 Ajahn Pasanno
 Ajahn Sao Kantasilo
 Ajahn Sobin S. Namto
 Ajahn Sucitto
 Ajahn Sumedho
 Ajahn Suwat Suvaco
 Ajahn Thate
 Ajahn Geoff

In Thai, such highly esteemed monks would rarely be called simply ajahn chah, ajahn mun, etc., as there are much more respectful ways for addressing or referring to them.

The term "Ajahn" is generally not formal enough to be used without the prefix "Pra" or "Tan" for monks when addressed by the laity, but this formality has been loosened when it comes to Western monks and Theravada monks well known outside Thailand.

See also
 Thera
 Achar
 Bhante
 Luang Por
 Sayadaw

References

Thai Buddhist titles